Hostivice is a town in Prague-West District in the Central Bohemian Region of the Czech Republic. It has about 8,800 inhabitants.

Administrative parts

The village of Břve is an administrative part of Hostivice.

Geography
Hostivice is located west of Prague, in its immediate vicinity. It lies in the Prague Plateau. The Litovický Stream flows through the territory and supply a set of ponds.

History
Břve is the oldest part of the town, the first written mention is from 1184. The first written mention of Hostivice is from 1277.

The current appearance of the town was created by merging and growing four separate villages: Hostivice, Litovice, Jeneček, and Břve. In 1849, Litovice, Jeneček and Břve merged to create one municipality of Litovice, and in 1950, it was merged with Hostivice. In 1978 Hostivice became a town.

Demographics

Transport
Hostivice lies close to Václav Havel Airport Prague. The D6 motorway from Prague to Karlovy Vary runs next to the town. Hostivice is also connected with Prague with the Smíchov – Hostivice railway line.

Notable people
David Rath (born 1965), politician; lives here

References

External links

Cities and towns in the Czech Republic
Populated places in Prague-West District